The 2020–21 Superliga was the 65th season of the Polish Superliga, the top men's handball league in Poland. A total of fourteen teams contested this season's league, which began on 5 September 2020 and concluded on 6 June 2021.

Łomża Vive Kielce won their 18th title of the Polish Champions.

Format
The competition format for the 2020–21 season consists of 14 teams each playing a total of 26 matches, half at home and half away, with the first placed team in the standings earning the Polish Championship. The last placed team is directly relegated to the 1st league, and the penultimate team play relegation playoffs with the willing team from the 1st league.

The winners are entitled to play in the EHF Champions League the following season. The 2nd, 3rd and 4th team in the standings gain a chance to take part in the upcoming EHF European League edition.

Standings

Results

References

External links
 Official website 

2020–21 domestic handball leagues
Superliga
Superliga
Superliga
Superliga